The demographics of Los Angeles County include a diverse people by race, ethnicity, and nationality. The 2010 United States Census reported that Los Angeles County had a population of 9,818,605. The racial makeup of Los Angeles County was 4,936,599 (50.3%) White, 856,874 (8.7%) African American, 72,828 (0.7%) Native American, 1,346,865 (13.7%) Asian (4.0% Chinese, 3.3% Filipino, 2.2% Korean, 1.0% Japanese, 0.9% Vietnamese, 0.8% Indian, 0.3% Cambodian, 0.3% Thai, 0.1% Pakistani), 26,094 (0.3%) Pacific Islander (0.15% Samoan, 0.05% Hawaiian, 0.03% Tongan), 2,140,632 (21.8%) from other races, and 438,713 (4.5%) from two or more races.

As of 2018, Non-Hispanic whites numbered 2,728,321, or 27.8% of the population. Hispanic or Latino residents of any race numbered 4,687,889 (47.7%); 35.8% of Los Angeles County's population was of Mexican ancestry; 3.7% Salvadoran, and 2.2% Guatemalan heritage,.

Religion
As of 2000, there are over 1,700 Christian churches, 202 Jewish synagogues, 145 Buddhist temples, 48 Islamic mosques, 44 Baháʼí worship centers, 37 Hindu temples, 28 Tenrikyo churches and fellowships, 16 Shinto worship centers, and 14 Sikh gurdwaras in the county. The Los Angeles Archdiocese has approximately 5 million members and is the largest in the United States.

Housing
The homeownership rate is 47.9%, and the median value for houses is $409,300. 42.2% of housing units are in multi-unit structures.

Undocumented Immigrants

As estimated by the Public Policy Institute of California in 2008, Los Angeles County is home to more than one-third of California's undocumented immigrants, who make up more than ten percent of the population.

Population by race

2000
As of the census of 2000, there were 9,519,338 people, 3,133,774 households, and 2,137,233 families residing in the county. The racial makeup of the county is 48.7% White 11.0% African American, 0.8% Native American, 10.0% Asian, 0.3% Pacific Islander, 23.5% from other races, and 4.9% from two or more races. 44.6% of the population are Hispanic or Latino of any race. The largest European-American ancestry groups are German (6%), Irish (5%), English (4%) and Italian (3%). 45.9% of the population reported speaking only English at home; 37.9% spoke Spanish, 2.22% Tagalog, 2.0% Chinese, 1.9% Korean, and 1.87% Armenian.

Because the county is so populous, what is not so evident is that it has the largest Native American population of any county in the nation: according to the 2000 census, it has more than 153,550 people of indigenous descent, and most are from Latin America. "The invisible population that is virtually ignored by the census is that of indigenous people from Mexico, Central and South America." In addition, there are Cherokee and other Native Americans from the US, and Pacific Islanders like Native Hawaiians from Hawaii, Samoa and other Pacific Islands. 

There were 3,133,774 households, out of which 36.80% had children under the age of 18 living with them, 47.6% were married couples living together, 14.7% had a female householder with no husband present, and 31.8% were non-families. 24.6% of all households were made up of individuals, and 7.1% had someone living alone who was 65 years of age or older. The average household size was 2.98 and the average family size was 3.61.

In the county, the population was spread out, with 28.0% under the age of 18, 10.3% from 18 to 24, 32.6% from 25 to 44, 19.4% from 45 to 64, and 9.7% who were 65 years of age or older. The median age was 32 years. For every 100 females there were 97.7 males. For every 100 females age 18 and over, there were 95.0 males.

The median income for a household in the county was $42,189, and the median income for a family was $46,452. Males had a median income of $36,299 versus $30,981 for females. The per capita income for the county was $20,683. There are 14.4% of families living below the poverty line and 17.9% of the population, including 24.2% of under 18 and 10.5% of those over 64.

According to TNS Financial Services, Los Angeles County has the highest number of millionaires of any county in the nation, totaling 261,081 households as of 2007. In addition to millionaires, Los Angeles County has the largest number of homeless people, with "48,000 people living on the streets, including 6,000 veterans."

2019 American Community Survey

According to the 2019 US Census Bureau estimates, Los Angeles County's population was 52.1% White (25.9% Non-Hispanic White), 8.1% Black or African American, 14.7% Asian, 0.8% Native American and Alaskan Native, 0.3% Pacific Islander, 19.9% Other Race, and 4.1% from two or more races. The White population continues to remain the largest racial category as Hispanics in Los Angeles County primarily identify as White (54.0%) with others identifying as Other Race (40.1%), Multiracial (3.6%), Black (0.7%), American Indian and Alaskan Native (1.2%), Asian (0.4%), and Hawaiian and Pacific Islander (0.1%). By ethnicity, 48.6% of the total population is Hispanic-Latino (of any race) and 51.4% is Non-Hispanic (of any race).

If Latinos were excluded from the racial categories and treated as if they were a separate group, Los Angeles County's 2019 population would be 48.6% Latino, 25.9% White Non-Hispanic, 7.7% Black or African American, 14.5% Asian, 0.2% Native American and Alaskan Native, 0.2% Pacific Islander, 0.4% Other Race, and 2.4% from two or more races.

Tables for places within Los Angeles County

Notes

References

Los Angeles County, California